Casatia is a genus of extinct cetacean from the Early Pliocene, approximately between 5.1 and 4.5 million years ago. The genus contains a single species, C. thermophila. It was described from a partial skull. Its closest relatives are the narwhal and beluga (white whale), yet the remains were found farther south than its relatives, supporting the theory that monodontids evolved from warm water genera before becoming adapted to cold water.

Fossils were discovered in Italy and are the first and only fossils of a monodontid from the Mediterranean Basin known. Fossils of the genus were also found near fossils of the modern bull and tiger sharks as well as many extinct marine mammals, such as the sirenian Metaxytherium subapenninum.

References

Monodontidae
Pliocene cetaceans
Fossil taxa described in 2019